Pehuajó Partido is a partido in the northeast  of Buenos Aires Province in Argentina.

Settlements

Abel
Alagón
Albariño
Ancón
Asturias
Capitán Castro
El Recado
Francisco Madero
Girondo
Gnecco
Inocencio Sosa
Juan José Paso
La Cotorra
Larramendy
Las Juanitas
Magdala
Mones Cazón
Nueva Plata
Pedro Gamen
Pehuajó
San Bernardo de Pehuajó
San Esteban

External links
 Website of Pehuajó

1889 establishments in Argentina
Partidos of Buenos Aires Province